Palo Duro High School is a school located in the city of Amarillo, Texas, United States, and is one of four high schools in the Amarillo Independent School District. As of the 2016–17 school year, it has 2,075 students.

The school was named after Palo Duro Canyon, a canyon system in the Texas Panhandle. 

Classified as a 5A school by the UIL. In 2015, the school was rated "Met Standard" by the Texas Education Agency.

Heritage, Traditions, and Other Customs. 
Palo Duro High School or maybe known by its nickname "the Pride of the Northside". With the motto "Virtute Et Labore" meaning power and labor in Latin. Palo Duro is one of the most ethnically diverse in the city, with students ranging from Hispanic to Asian, and African students.

Athletics
The Palo Duro Dons compete in these sports -

Cross Country, Volleyball, Football, Wrestling, Basketball, Swimming, Soccer, Golf, Bowling, Tennis, Track, Softball & Baseball

State Titles
Boys Basketball -
1956(3A)
Girls Wrestling -
2001(All), 2003(All)

1992 shooting
On September 11, 1992, then 17-year-old Randy Earl Matthews who transferred to the school from Memphis High School in Memphis, Texas at the start of the school year, shot and wounded 6 students with a .22-caliber pistol inside a hallway after a morning pep rally for a football game against Hereford High School. Luckily, all 6 students survived the shooting. Amarillo Police quickly caught him and another student who attempted to flee the scene. Matthews was charged with one count of attempted murder, five counts of aggravated assault and one count of unlawfully carrying a weapon onto school grounds, in which he served 8 years. The other student who was with him was also arrested. The shooting was believed to be a "gang shooting", all stemming from a fight in which a student had punched Matthews in the face.

Feeder schools (Palo Duro Cluster)

Middle schools
Horace Mann Middle School
Travis Middle School
Travis 6th Grade Campus
Allen Middle School (6th Grade campus)

Elementary schools
Eastridge Elementary
Emerson Elementary
Forest Hill Elementary
Hamlet Elementary
Park Hills Elementary
Mesa Verde Elementary
Pleasant Valley Elementary
Will Rogers Elementary
Whittier Elementary

Notable alumni
Michael Cobbins (born 1992), basketball player for Maccabi Haifa of the Israeli Basketball Premier League
Thomas E. Creek (Class of 1968), Medal of Honor recipient
Jinh Yu Frey (Class of 2003), professional Mixed Martial Artist, Invicta FC Atomweight Champion
Ziggy Hood (Class of 2005), NFL football player
Montrel Meander (Class of 2013), NFL player
Oscar Priego (Class of 2004), soap opera actor
Terry Stafford (Class of 1960), country music singer & songwriter
William Thomas (Class of 1987), NFL player

Notable staff
Shanna Peeples, 2015 National Teacher of the Year.

References

External links
Palo Duro High School

Educational institutions established in 1955
Amarillo Independent School District
Schools in Potter County, Texas
Public high schools in Texas
1955 establishments in Texas